Julfalar Mosque was an Azerbaijani mosque located in Shusha, Karabakh region of Azerbaijan about 350 km southwest from capital Baku.
 
The mosque is located on intersection of Uzeyir Hajibeyov and S. Asgarov streets of Julfalar neighborhood of Shusha. Julfalar neighbourhood is one of 9 lower and earlier neighbourhoods of Shusha. In total, there are 17 main neighbourhoods. Julfalar Mosque was one of the 17th mosques functioning in Shusha by the end of the 19th century. It was regarded one of the most valuable monuments of Shusha along with Yukhari Govhar Agha Mosque and Ashaghi Govhar Agha Mosque. There were no minarets and exterior design of Julfalar Mosque followed a rectangular plan neighborhood mosque building like Chukhur Mahalla and Haji Yusifli mosques but the interior completely complied with Islamic religious architecture

See also
Yukhari Govhar Agha Mosque
Ashaghi Govhar Agha Mosque
Saatli Mosque
Seyidli Mosque
Khoja Marjanli Mosque
Guyulug Mosque
Taza Mahalla Mosque

References

External links

Karabakh Monuments

Mosques in Shusha
19th-century mosques
Karbalayi Safikhan Karabakhi buildings and structures